Lower Sapey is a village and civil parish  in the Malvern Hills District in  the county of Worcestershire, England.

Sapey Pritchard was in the upper division of Doddingtree Hundred.

See also
Old St Bartholomew's Church, Lower Sapey

References

External links

 Lower Sapey Council official website
 Lower Sapey parish website

Villages in Worcestershire